Mount Bowser is a prominent peak,  high, standing  south of Mount Astor at the north end of Fram Mesa, in the Queen Maud Mountains. It was mapped by the United States Geological Survey from surveys and from U.S. Navy air photos, 1960–64, and named by the Advisory Committee on Antarctic Names for Carl J. Bowser, a geologist at McMurdo Station, 1965–66 and 1966–67 seasons.

References 

Mountains of the Ross Dependency
Amundsen Coast